Saw Omma was the chief queen consort of four consecutive kings of Pinya and Ava Kingdoms from 1350 to 1367. Descended from Pagan and Myinsaing–Pinya royal lines, the queen was well known for her beauty, and was selected as the chief queen of the last three kings of Pinya: Kyawswa II, Narathu and Uzana II. After the death of her fourth husband King Thado Minbya of Ava in 1367, she and her fifth husband Nga Nu unsuccessfully tried to seize the Ava throne. Her brother King Swa Saw Ke, who succeeded Thado Minbya, pardoned her but also married her off to the commander who captured her.

Early life
Saw Omma was born Ommadanti to Shin Myat Hla and Min Shin Saw, governor of Thayet c. 1333. She was a granddaughter of King Kyawswa of Pagan and a grand-niece of King Thihathu of Pinya. The princess was the youngest child of six. Her siblings included Governor Shwe Nan Shin of Myinsaing, Governor Saw Yan Naung of Prome and King Swa Saw Ke of Ava.

The princess spent much of her childhood years in Launggyet, the capital of Arakan (present-day Rakhine State), the kingdom west of Thayet. The Arakanese raided Thayet in early January 1334, and sent the governor and his entire family to Launggyet on 7 January 1334 (2nd waxing of Tabodwe 695 ME). The family was treated well at Launggyet where the children were educated by one of the most learned monks there. Circa 1343, the entire family was allowed to return to Pinya where her father was reappointed to his old position at Thayet.

Queen of Pinya and Ava
According to the chronicles, the princess grew up to be a great beauty. On 12 December 1350, Kyawswa II, a second cousin of hers, took over the Pinya throne and married her as his chief queen. After Kyawswa II died in March 1359, his younger brother Narathu succeeded, and made his sister-in-law, now known as Saw Omma, his chief queen. Narathu came to power just as Shan raids from the north began to intensify. The raiders sacked both Upper Burmese kingdoms of Sagaing and Pinya in April and June 1364 successively, and took away Narathu. Narathu's elder brother Uzana II succeeded and raised her to chief queen. But Uzana II's reign lasted a mere three months. In September 1364, Thado Minbya, who had taken over the Sagaing throne, conquered Pinya, and made her his chief queen.

Though Thado Minbya hailed from Sagaing, he and Saw Omma were related: He was her second cousin once removed. According to the chronicles, the young king, who was at least a dozen years her junior, was madly in love with her. It was not just the king who appreciated her beauty. When Nga Tet Pya, a famous bandit from Sagaing, who stole from the rich and shared the loot with the poor, was captured, brought before the king, and asked of how he chose to be executed, Tet Pya reportedly said he chose Saw Omma, the prettiest queen.

In rebellion
One of the king's close advisers, Nga Nu, quickly sailed up the Irrawaddy with his men, and entered the queen's chambers. He told the queen that he had come to kill her on Thado Minbya's orders because the king did not want her to be taken by another man. Saw Omma is said to have asked: "Nga Nu, aren't you a man?" The duo then decided to seize the throne. Nga Nu's men killed off the palace guards and maids, who did not agree with the plan. Ultimately they decided to leave for Sagaing, right across the Irrawaddy from Ava. There, the couple proclaimed themselves king and queen of Sagaing, hoping to revive the old Sagaing Kingdom.

However, the pretenders from Pinya did not attract any allegiance from the former vassals of Sagaing. At Ava, her own brother Swa Saw Ke was elected to become king on 5 September 1367. One of his first acts as king was to dispatch a battalion to remove the couple from Sagaing. The battalion was commanded by Nga Nu's elder brother Yazathingyan Nga Mauk. Nga Nu escaped but Saw Omma was caught. Swa spared his sister's life, and married her off to Nga Mauk, who was made governor of Taungbyon and Wayindok, two small regions near modern Mount Popa.

Notes

References

Bibliography
 
 
 
 
 
 

Queens consort of Pinya
Chief queens consort of Ava
14th-century Burmese women